Crenicichla britskii is a species of cichlid native to South America. It is found in the Paraná River basin, in the Paraná River drainage upstream from Guaira, Brazil.

The fish is named in honor of Heraldo A. Britski of the Universidade de São Paulo, for his help arranging excursions during Kullander’s stay in São Paulo, which during the type specimen was collected.

References

Kullander, S.O., 2003. Cichlidae (Cichlids). p. 605-654. In R.E. Reis, S.O. Kullander and C.J. Ferraris, Jr. (eds.) Checklist of the Freshwater Fishes of South and Central America. Porto Alegre: EDIPUCRS, Brasil. 

britskii
Freshwater fish of Brazil
Taxa named by Sven O. Kullander
Fish described in 1991